Zaynah Vastani is an Indian television child actress. Her twin sister is child actress Ziyah Vastani.

Television
Aapki Antara as Antara
Alaxmi Ka Super Parivaar as Tinku Laxman Kapadia
Bade Achhe Lagte Hain as Pari Ram Kapoor

References

Living people
Indian television actresses
Indian child actresses
21st-century Indian child actresses
Year of birth missing (living people)
Place of birth missing (living people)